Willich ist a German-language surname.

 Anthony Florian Madinger Willich (died 1804), German medical writer
 August Willich (1810–1878), military officer in the Prussian Army
 Ehrenfried von Willich (1777–1807), Protestant chaplain
 Jodocus Willich (1501 or c. 1486–1552), German physician and writer
 Quirin op dem Veld von Willich (died 1537), Roman Catholic prelate

German-language surnames